The 2015 Scheldeprijs was the 103rd edition of the Scheldeprijs cycling classic. It took place on 8 April, starting in Antwerp and ending in Schoten. The race was rated as a 1.HC event and was part of the 2015 UCI Europe Tour.

The Scheldeprijs particularly suited the sprinters as it included several cobbled roads but no significant climbs. The winner in the previous three editions, Marcel Kittel was forced to withdraw from the race due to illness; Mark Cavendish, who had also won the race on three occasions, chose not to participate, as did André Greipel. The race favourite was therefore Alexander Kristoff, who had won the Tour of Flanders the previous weekend. Other riders considered to have a chance of victory included Peter Sagan, Elia Viviani and Romain Feillu.

There was a large crash at the front of the peloton in the last two kilometres of the race. This took out many of the race favourites. Kristoff was without teammates in the final part of the race, but he was able to follow the  train to win the sprint finish from the small group that had avoided the crash.

Teams 
25 teams were invited to the race, including 12 UCI WorldTeams and 13 Professional Continental teams.

Results

References

External links 

2015
Scheldeprijs
Scheldeprijs